Salim  Abduvaliev (Uzbek: Салим Абдувалиев, born in Tashkent, Uzbek SSR in 1950) is a uzbek producer and Internet celebrity. In 2015, the producer was awarded the "Do’slik" State Prize of Uzbekistan and the "Ludwig Nobel Prize" in 2022.

Biography
Abduvaliev was born in May 1950 Tashkent city. His father was the collective farm chairman. After retiring from the sport of freestyle wrestling, he worked in a factory, then he became a trucker.

In 2006 he defended his thesis of Candidate of Economic Sciences on the theme "Management of social and economic development of municipal unions: generalization of the experience of Russia and the Republic of Uzbekistan."

Career

Sport charity
Abduvaliev is the President of the Wrestling Association of Uzbekistan. He sponsors the World Wrestling Championships, the international tournament "Grand Prix" cups of Independence of Uzbekistan in freestyle wrestling and others competitions. His money holds the largest youth and children's tournaments. He sponsors wrestling teams for four boarding schools for orphans.

For several years, the Tennis Uzbekistan President Cup was sponsored by Abduvaliev.

Filmography 
Below is a chronologically ordered list of films in which Salim Abduvaliev has appeared.

Series

Awards and nominations 
 "Ludwig Nobel Prize" 2022

References

External links 
Salim AbduvalievInstagram
Salim Abduvaliev Facebook

Living people
1950 births
Businesspeople from Tashkent
Uzbekistani male sport wrestlers